The Erwin Auxiliary Army Airfield is a former World War II-era airfield near Newport, Arkansas, United States. The site, now in agricultural use, is located south of the city, northeast of the junction of Arkansas Highway 14 and United States Route 67. It had two runways, which formed an X shape. The airfield was built in 1942 as an auxiliary to the main Army Airfield at Newport (now Newport Municipal Airport), and was used for training and military exercises. It was briefly reactivated in 1946–49, but was definitively abandoned sometime before 1964.

The airfield site was listed on the National Register of Historic Places in 2008.

See also
Arkansas World War II Army Airfields
National Register of Historic Places listings in Jackson County, Arkansas

References

Military facilities on the National Register of Historic Places in Arkansas
Airports established in 1942
Buildings and structures in Jackson County, Arkansas
World War II on the National Register of Historic Places
1942 establishments in Arkansas
National Register of Historic Places in Jackson County, Arkansas